The following is a list of members of the Rahvuskogu, the bicameral Estonian National Assembly which was convened after the 1936 Estonian National Assembly referendum received popular support to draft a new constitution. The First Chamber had 80 members and was elected (although opposition parties were not allowed to stand), and the Second Chamber contained 40 representatives of corporate chambers. Elections for the First Chamber were held in December 1936 and the Rahvuskogu sat between 18 February 1937 and 17 August 1937, approving a new constitution. The Riigikogu was substantially reformed and sat for its sixth session the following year.

List of members of the First Chamber 
Source: Jaan Toomla, Valitud ja Valitsenud: Eesti parlamentaarsete ja muude esinduskogude ning valitsuste isikkoosseis aastail 1917–1999 (National Library of Estonia, 1999), pp. 67–68.

Aleksander Arak
Eduard Arnover
Taavet Avarmaa (Akermann)
Kaarel Eenpalu (Einbund)
Valter-Gerhard Freimann (Kadarik)
Ernst Haabpiht (Habicht)
Mihkel Hansen
Johan Hansing
Jaan Järve
Mihkel Jürisson (Jüris)
August Jürman (Jürmann or Jürima)
August Jürman (Jürmann or Jürima)
Juhan Kaarlimäe (Karlsberg)
Jakob Kalju
Jakob Kalle
Aleksander-Oskar Karineel (Kornel)
Karl Ferdinand Karlson
Oskar Kask
Artur Kasterpalu
Tõnis Kind (Kint)
August Kohver (Kotter)
Jaan Kokk
Lembit Kolk
Karl Eduard Kompus
Evald Konno
Valter Krimm
Jakob Kristelstein
Kustav Aleksander Kurg
Mihail Kurtschinsky
Peeter Kõpp
August Laur
Heinrich Lauri
August Lepik (Leppik)
Artur-Aleksander Linholm (Linari)
Oskar Lõvi
August Miljan
Alfred Mõttus
Alfred Mäeloog
August Mälk
Enn Nurmiste (Neuhaus)
Ants Oidermaa (Oidermann)
Ludvig Ojaveski (Mühlbach)
Aleksander Ossipov
Jüri Ottas
Johannes Paabusk (Pabusk)
Karl-Eduard Pajos (Pajus)
Johannes Perens
Juhan Piirimaa (Freimuth)
Juhan Pitka
Otto Pukk
Karl Puusemp
Otto-Rudolf Pärlin
Viktor Päts
Eduard Riismann (Riisna)
Ants Roos
Vladimir Roslavlev
Martin Rõigas
Mihkel Rõuk
Johan-Oskar Rütli
Karl Theodor Saarmann
Karl Selter
Oskar Silde
Oskar Albert Suursööt
Priit Suve (Zube)
Toomas Takjas (Takkias)
Hendrik Tallo
Nikolai Talts
Henn Treial
Jaan Treumann
Mihkel Truusööt
Artur Tupits
Anton Uesson
Jüri Uluots
Juhan Uuemaa (Neumann)
August Vann
Richard Veermaa (Vreeman)
Aleksander August Veiderma (Veidermann)
Mihkel-Voldemar Vellema (Velberg)
Värdi Velner
Julius Voolaid (Vollmann)

List of members of the Second Chamber 
Source: Jaan Toomla, Valitud ja Valitsenud: Eesti parlamentaarsete ja muude esinduskogude ning valitsuste isikkoosseis aastail 1917–1999 (National Library of Estonia, 1999), pp. 68–69.

Friedrich Karl Akel
Ado Anderkopp
Johannes-Leopold Antik
Linda Eenpalu
David Grimm
Heinrich Gutkin
Johan Haagivang
Johan Holberg
Jüri Jaakson
Alma Jeets
Aleksander Kask
Paul Kogerman
Oskar Koplus
Hugo Villi Kukke
Eduard Laaman
Kaarel Liidak (Liideman)
Karl Luik
Jüri Marksoo (Markson)
Aleksander Naeres (Naeris)
Viktor Neggo
Johannes Orasmaa (Roska)
Anton Palvadre
Aleksander Paulus
Ants Piip
Johann Post
Joakim Puhk
Mihkel Pung
Hugo-Bernhard Rahamägi
Aleksander Rei
Jaak Reichmann
Karl Robert Ruus
Aleksander Saar
Karl Schlossmann
Johan Sepp
Jaan Soots
Priit Suit
Harald Tammer
Aleksander Tõnisson
Aleksander Veiler
Hellmuth Weiss

References 

Lists of political office-holders in Estonia